The Stone Twins is a creative branding agency based in Amsterdam. It was founded by twin brothers Declan and Garech Stone (born 8 November 1970, Dublin), graduates of the National College of Art and Design, Dublin.

The Stone Twins have a reputation for ideas-based, engaging and strategic design solutions. Their body of work is quite eclectic, with no fixed visual style - as it equally embraces the palettes of graphic design, art-direction and copywriting. The firm's award-winning work includes a coveted Dutch Design Award, several European Design Awards and 12 D&AD Pencils. Their work forms part of the permanent collections of the Cooper-Hewitt, National Design Museum, New York and the Stedelijk Museum Amsterdam.

The Stone Twins regularly write for trade magazines, including Communicatie (Wolters Kluwer) and Eye magazine: the International Review of Graphic Design. They are authors of the book Logo R.I.P. (A Commemoration of Dead Logos); the updated 2nd edition was launched in the Cooper-Hewitt, National Design Museum, New York in 2012. They are keen educators, and were Head of the ‘Man and Communication’ department at Design Academy Eindhoven from 2008 until their resignation in 2013.

Books
The Stone Twins have written the following books:
 Logo R.I.P., (A Commemoration of Dead Logos), BIS Publishers, 2012. (ISBN 9789063692902)
 A Catalogue of Curiosities, Relics, Art & Propaganda (CRAP), 2010.
 Hello, I’m A’DAM (The Creation of a New Amsterdam Icon), A’DAM Toren C.V., 2021. (ISBN 9789082075885)

Magazine Articles
Selected articles written by The Stone Twins:
 Chameleons (Single-character logos provide rich, raw material for identity design) – Eye, No. 67, Vol. 17, Spring 2008. 
 Logos without words – Eye, No. 80, Vol. 20, Summer 2011.

Exhibitions
Selected exhibitions:
 2015 Liminal – Irish design at the threshold, Eindhoven, Milan, New York and Dublin (group show)
 2012 New Graphic Design Collection, Stedelijk Museum Amsterdam (group show)
 2012 Graphic Design: Now in Production, Walker Art Center, Minneapolis and the Cooper-Hewitt National Design Museum, New York (group show)
 2011 Underground by The Stone Twins, Zeeuws Museum, Middelburg (art installation)
 2008 1600 X Zierikzee by The Stone Twins, Zeeuws Museum, Middelburg (art installation)

Controversies and criticism
Since 2020, the agency has been responsible for questioning the fearmongering around COVID-19 and the proportionately of the measures/restrictions.

References

Design companies of the Netherlands
Companies based in Amsterdam
Alumni of the National College of Art and Design